Yumi Kim is a women's clothing line, created by American fashion designer Kim Phan. It is located in New York City, United States.

History
Designer Kim Phan first launched Yumi Kim in 2004. Her collections include vintage bodies, printed dresses, jumpers, tops, shorts, and jackets. Each piece is made entirely of silk.

Locations
There are two Yumi Kim flagship stores. The first opened in 2008 on New York's Lower East Side at 105 Stanton St. The store was the first location to carry the entire Yumi Kim collection along with vintage accessories, bags, and shoes. After the opening of the flagship store, the Yumi Kim online shop was launched in March 2009.

Boutiques and multi-chain shops and department stores throughout the country carry Yumi Kim. Yumi Kim is also a featured brand on Rent the Runway.

A second Yumi Kim flagship store opened in 2011 on New York's Upper East Side at 1331 3rd Ave at 76th St. Compared to the Stanton Street flagship, the uptown shop has a more elegant uptown feel.

Recognition
Yumi Kim has been featured in magazines such as Lucky, People, US Weekly, In Touch, InStyle, and Cosmopolitan. Over the years, Yumi Kim has garnered a celebrity following, with Paris Hilton, Nicky Hilton, Stephanie Pratt, Kim Kardashian, Khloé Kardashian, Kendra Wilkinson, Audrina Patridge, Busy Philipps, Camila Alves, Gabrielle Union, and Lauren Conrad having been photographed in Yumi Kim. Talk show hosts including Giuliana Rancic, Lara Spencer, Kristin Dos Santos, Kristina Guerrero, and Ashlan Gorse have also appeared on television wearing Yumi Kim.

Further reading
 Cosmopolitan Magazine "Tell a Captivating Story" (September 2008)
 British Vogue Magazine "Vogue Shops" (May 2008)
 Lucky Magazine "Lucky Breaks" (May 2008)
 Life & Style Magazine "The 15 Best" (January 2008)
 Audrey Magazine "New Year, New You" (January 2008)
 Audrey Magazine "Style-Phile" (June/July 2007)
 Daily Candy "Fall Forward" (October 2, 2006)
 Lucky Magazine "Two to Watch" (June 2006)
 Metro New York Paper "Vintage Sweet Meets Hipster Cool" (March 2006)

References

External links 
 
 http://racked.com/archives/2009/01/27/in_the_window_yumi_kim_hearts_sales.php
 http://shopmoderne.com/designers/yumi-kim
 http://newyork.timeout.com/venues/chinatown-little-italy/11931/project-234
 http://www.ladylux.com/style/site/article/interview-kim-phan-of-yumi-kim/
 https://web.archive.org/web/20120318070046/http://fashionista.com/2011/06/yumi-kim%E2%80%99s-kim-phan-opens-her-upper-east-side-boutique-and-makes-us-feel-at-home/
http://ny.racked.com/archives/2011/05/25/the_new_yumi_kim_ues_outpost_opened_this_morning.php
http://www.ladylux.com/style/site/article/interview-kim-phan-of-yumi-kim/

Clothing brands of the United States